Pavel Grigoryevich Lyubimov (7 September 1938 – 23 June 2010) was a Soviet and Russian film director and screenwriter.

Biography
In 1962, he graduated from the directing department of the State Institute of Cinematography (Studios Roshal and Hanicke). In 1964 he began working at Gorky Film Studio. In 1964 his thesis film Aunt with Violets was awarded a festival prize in Krakow. He was awarded a Silver Dovzhenko Medal for his directing of the film Spring Appeal, with Alexander Fatyushin and Igor Kostolevsky in the leading roles. Creatively Lyubimov had an inherent interest in contemporary issues hidden in everyday life. Women and Spring Appeal are among his most admired films. He was named a Meritorious Artist of the Russian Federation in (2000).

Selected filmography
Aunt with Violets (1963, thesis film)
Women (1966)
Running on Waves (1967)
Spring Appeal (1977)
School Waltz (1978)
The Pathfinder (1978)

References

External links

1938 births
2010 deaths
Russian screenwriters
Male screenwriters
Russian male writers
Russian film directors